A cob is traditionally a draft type pony. Typically of a stout build, with strong bones, large joints, and steady disposition, it is a body type of horse rather than a specific breed. Historically, in the United Kingdom and, to a lesser extent, the eastern United States, a 'cob' may be a common horse used for everyday riding but in the past was used for driving carts.

The term continues to be widely used to describe this type of horse in the United Kingdom, but less so in North America.  In the United States, the term "cob" is primarily used to describe the Welsh cob, and in the sizing of bridles for horses, designating a smaller size that will fit not only the Welsh cob, but also many Morgans, Arabians, some American Quarter Horses, and other horses with short, triangular-shaped heads.

Characteristics
In general terms, cobs are larger than ponies, standing  or taller, but are relatively small and compact, usually with somewhat short legs. The breed of horse known today as the Section D Welsh cob exemplifies the classic build of the historic cob. It is said that a good show cob should have "the head of a lady and the backside of a cook."

Popular uses of the cob include driving, showing and recreational riding. Cob-type breeds have become increasingly popular for Riding for the Disabled Association (RDA), as well as for riders who seek horses who are responsive but with a calm temperament, shorter stature and steady, comfortable gaits.

The rulebook of the British Show Horse Association (BHSA), states: "The Cob is a type rather than a breed.

Show Cobs
Show cobs in the United Kingdom are overseen by the British Show Horse Association (BSHA), formerly known as The British Show Hack, Cob and Riding Horse Association.  Cobs are registered in three divisions: lightweight, heavyweight, or Maxi Cob exceeding .  The classes where cobs are shown also have a similar breakdown:

 Maxi Cob exceeding : to be judged as Cobs. Judges must pay particular attention to type (i.e. short legged animals of Cob type). Preferably to be shown hogged.

Maxi Cobs are treated a bit differently from other divisions.  The highest placed animals qualify for the Maxi Cob final at the National Championship show. Winners of these classes are not eligible for open cob championships..

Presentation
Cobs are exhibited with  manes hogged, legs trimmed, and pulled tails and may be ridden astride or sidesaddle.

Working Cobs
Working Cob classes may also be held, where the horses must jump a series of fences and then demonstrate their paces on the flat in a manner similar to the requirements in British Working Hunter classes.

Fence heights for novice classes are minimum 2'3", maximum 2'6", with a maximum spread 2'6". In open classes, fences are 2'6–2'9", maximum spread 2'9".   The height of the jumps may be raised at the National Championship Show at the discretion of the Course Builder or Show Director.

Dress code
As with all horse showing disciplines, riders who exhibit cobs are required to conform to strict rules for personal attire.

Daytime dress
 Bowler hat for men, bowler or hunting cap for women.
 Tweed coat for men. Tweed coat or plain black or blue for women.
 Plain fawn or buff coloured breeches - not white.
 Plain black or brown boots.
 Garter straps. Points must face outwards and buckle should be against and between buttons on breeches.
 Spurs should be worn by exhibitors and must be high on the heel of the boot and horizontal.
 Any style of leather or string gloves.
 Plain malacca or leather cane, not to exceed 32”. No schooling whips.
 Collar and ordinary tie. Tie must be pinned down.
 Ordinary shirt.
 No earrings

Evening dress
 Hunting Dress with hunting whips.
 Ladies wear black or blue hunting coats with bowler hat or hunting cap. Fawn breeches and black boots and garter straps. Some ladies now wear top hats in the evening.
 Gentlemen wear scarlet or black hunt coat, either ordinary pattern or cut away. White breeches must be worn with scarlet coat and boots with tops and white garter straps. White breeches with black patent top boots may be worn with black coats or coloured breeches and plain black boots. Top hat to be worn.

Popular cob breeds
A number of cob breeds are popular in the UK, including the Welsh cob and the Gypsy Cob, also known as the "Coloured Cob" or "Irish Cob," known in the US as the Gypsy Vanner Horse.

Welsh Cobs

The breed of horse known as the Section D Welsh cob exemplifies the typical build of the traditional cob.  In competition, unlike most other cobs, these animals are shown with full manes and tails.

Coloured Cobs

Traditional or "Gypsy" cobs are often seen in "coloured" horse classes. Originally a favourite of Romany travellers, who used them to pull caravans, they are now used for driving, dressage, showing, and even jumping.

Norman Cobs

The Norman Cob or Cob Normand is a breed of light draft horse that originated in the province of Normandy in northern France.

References

 British Show Horse Association

External links
 Video: Horse Of The Year Show heavyweight cob of the year lap of honour

Types of horse
Horse showing and exhibition